was a secret Japanese government report created by the Ministry of Health and Welfare's Institute of Population Problems (now the National Institute of Population and Social Security Research), and completed on July 1, 1943.

The document, comprising six volumes totaling 3,127 pages, deals with race theory in general, and the rationale behind policies adopted by wartime Japan towards other races, while also providing a vision of the Asia-Pacific under Japanese control.

The document was written in an academic style, surveying Western philosophy on race from the writings of Plato and Aristotle to modern German social scientists, such as Karl Haushofer. A connection between racism, nationalism and imperialism was also claimed, with the conclusion, drawing by citing both British and German sources, that overseas expansionism was essential not only for military and economic security, but for preserving racial consciousness. Concerns pertaining to the cultural assimilation of second and third generation immigrants into foreign cultures were also mentioned.

Discovery
The document was classified, had a print run of only a hundred copies, had little effect on the war , and was forgotten until 1981, when portions were discovered in a used bookstore in Japan, and subsequently publicized by being used as source material for a chapter in historian John W. Dower's book War Without Mercy: Race and Power in the Pacific War. In 1982 the Ministry of Health and Welfare re-issued the full six-volume version along with another two volumes entitled The Influence of War upon Population as a reference work for historians.

Impact
Although external Japanese propaganda during World War II emphasized Pan-Asianist and anti-colonial themes, specifically anti-Western imperialist themes, domestic propaganda always took Japanese superiority over other Asians for granted. However, Japan never had an overarching racial theory for Asia until well into the 1930s—following the Japanese invasion of China, military planners decided that they should raise Japanese racial consciousness in order to forestall the potential assimilation of Japanese colonists.

Since the document was written by the Ministry of Health and Welfare, which wasn't a powerful arm of the bureaucracy at the time and it had to essentially censor its own recommendations so as not to violate official doctrine and policy of the Japanese empire and it could not even obtain a public hearing over its ideas, it seems that the document itself would have had little impact over Japanese policymakers.

Themes

Colonization and living space

Some statements in the document coincide with the then-publicly espoused concept of Yamato people; however, much of the work borrowed heavily from German National Socialist racial, political and economic theories, including mention of the "Jewish question" and inclusion of racist anti-Jewish political cartoons, although Japan had a mostly negligible and overlooked Jewish minority. The term "Blood and Soil" was frequently used, though usually in quotes, as if to indicate its alien origin.

The authors rationalized Japanese colonization of most of the Eastern Hemisphere including New Zealand and Australia, with projected populations by the 1950s, as "securing the living space of the Yamato race," a very clear reflection of the Nazi concept of Lebensraum.

Racial supremacy
However, where the document deviated from Nazi ideology was in its use of Confucianism and the metaphor of the patriarchical family. This metaphor, with the non-Japanese Asians serving as children of the Japanese, rationalized the "equitable inequality" of Japanese political, economic, and cultural dominance. Just as a family has harmony and reciprocity, but with a clear-cut hierarchy, the Japanese, as a purportedly racially superior people, were destined to rule Asia "eternally" and become the supreme dominant leader of all humanity and ruler of the world. The term "proper place" was used frequently throughout the document.

The document left open whether Japan was destined eventually to become head of the global family of nations.

Jinshu and Minzoku
However, the authors went on to assert that blood mattered. It approved of Hitler's concern about finding the "Germanness" of his people. It made explicit calls, sometimes approaching Nazi attitudes, for eugenic improvements, calling for the medical profession not to concentrate on the sickly and weak, and for mental and physical training and selective marriages to improve the population.

See also
 Ethnic issues in Japan
 Hakkō ichiu – "eight cords, one roof"
 Honorary Aryan
 Manifesto of Race
 Scientific racism
 Shinmin no Michi
 Tanaka Memorial
 Yamato people
 Yamato-damashii – "the Japanese spirit"
North Korea:
 The Cleanest Race, which suggests that the ideology of the North Korean government is derived from 1930s Japanese racialism.

References

1943 non-fiction books
Racism in Japan
Ethnic supremacy
Government reports
Japan in World War II
Jewish Japanese history
Jews and Judaism in Japan
Politics of World War II
Race and intelligence controversy
Race in Japan
Scientific racism
Yamato people